Hold/Still is a studio album by the Canadian rock band Suuns, produced by John Congleton and released in 2016 by the record label Secretly Canadian.

Critical reception

Accolades

Track listing

Charts

References

External links
 CD | LP at Secretly Canadian

2016 albums
Albums produced by John Congleton
Secretly Canadian albums
Suuns albums